is a Japanese professional footballer of Korean descent who plays as a goalkeeper. He currently play for J1 League club, Sagan Tosu.

Career
Park attended Korea University (Japan) before signing for Fujieda MYFC in 2012. He played for one season, before going to FC Korea and then returning again to Fujieda. In January 2016, he signed for another J3 team, FC Ryūkyū. In 2019 he signed for J1 League club Yokohama F. Marinos. In 2020 he loaned for J1 League club, Sagan Tosu from Yokohama F. Marinos. In 2021, He permanently his club after loan.

Career statistics

Club
.

Honours

Club
FC Ryukyu
 J3 League (1): 2018

Yokohama F. Marinos
 J1 League (1): 2019

Personal
Yokohama F. Marinos
 J.League Outstanding Player award (1): 2019

References

External links

Profile at Sagan Tosu

1989 births
Living people
Association football people from Saitama Prefecture
South Korean footballers
J1 League players
J3 League players
Japan Football League players
Fujieda MYFC players
FC Ryukyu players
Yokohama F. Marinos players
Sagan Tosu players
Association football goalkeepers